Robert Crowley (born July 21, 1942) is an American bobsledder. He competed in the four-man event at the 1968 Winter Olympics.

References

1942 births
Living people
American male bobsledders
Olympic bobsledders of the United States
Bobsledders at the 1968 Winter Olympics
People from Jay, New York